George Josselyn (1 January, 1807 Belstead - 6 May 1888) was a solicitor and Conservative Party politician who played a prominent part civic life in Ipswich, Suffolk.

Family life
Josselyn married Elizabeth Browne Bell, the daughter of Captain Scarlet Browne Bell, of the East India Company, who had died before she was born.

Political career
Josselyn was an Alderman of Ipswich from 1846-1878 and served as mayor of Ipswich three times in 1842-3, 1851-2 and 1859-60.

Business career
George was a director of the Great Eastern Railway.

References

1807 births
1888 deaths
19th-century English lawyers
Mayors of Ipswich, Suffolk